Romai Sports is a design and manufacturing company of sportswear and accessories that are worn by players from various football teams. The sports firm is the only establishment in the United Arab Emirates which engages in such activities.

History
Romai was founded by Khamis Al-Rumaithy on July 12, 2012, becoming the first company in the United Arab Emirates to engage in the design and sales of sportswear for athletes.

Sponsorships
In the same year, Romai sponsored and designed sportswear for Al Wasl Sports Club that spanned from 2012 to 2013, after which followed other teams:

Football

National teams
 2014–2019
 2015–2018
 2018
 2017-2018

Club teams
 Bahraini Premier League — All clubs 2017–2019
 Al Wasl Sports Club 2012–2013
 Al Wahda Sports Club 2013–2015
 Al Fateh 2016–2018
 Al Shabab 2015–2018

Futsal

National teams
 UAE 2014–2016

Club teams
 Al-Dhafra

Handball

Club teams
 Emirates

Merchandise
An online store for the sportswear’s company in now available.

References

Sportswear brands
Manufacturing companies based in Abu Dhabi
Emirati brands
2012 establishments in the United Arab Emirates
Clothing companies established in 2012
Sporting goods manufacturers of the United Arab Emirates